Oliver James Dickey (April 6, 1823 – April 21, 1876) was a Republican member of the U.S. House of Representatives from Pennsylvania.

Biography
Oliver J. Dickey (son of John Dickey) was born in Old Brighton, Pennsylvania.  He attended Beaver Academy and Dickinson College in Carlisle, Pennsylvania.  He studied law, was admitted to the bar at Lancaster, Pennsylvania, in 1844 and practiced.  He served as district attorney of Lancaster County, Pennsylvania, from 1856 to 1859.  During the American Civil War, Dickey served as lieutenant colonel of the Tenth Regiment, Pennsylvania Volunteers.

Dickey was elected as a Republican to the Fortieth Congress to fill the vacancy caused by the death of Thaddeus Stevens and on the same day was elected to the Forty-first Congress.  He was reelected to the Forty-second Congress.  He was not a candidate for renomination in 1872.  He was a delegate to the State constitutional convention at Harrisburg, Pennsylvania in 1873.  He resumed the practice of law in Lancaster and died in 1876. He was interred in Woodward Hill Cemetery.

References
 Retrieved on 2008-02-14
The Political Graveyard

Union Army officers
Pennsylvania lawyers
Politicians from Lancaster, Pennsylvania
1823 births
1876 deaths
Republican Party members of the United States House of Representatives from Pennsylvania
19th-century American politicians
Burials at Woodward Hill Cemetery
19th-century American lawyers
People of Pennsylvania in the American Civil War